Samuel Ferris (29 August 1900 – 21 March 1980) was a British long-distance running athlete who competed mainly in the marathon. He was born in Magherabeg, near Dromore, County Down in Ireland. He won a silver medal for Great Britain in the marathon at the 1932 Summer Olympics.

He served as the second president of the then recently formed UK Road Runners Club during 1954.

References

External link

1900 births
1980 deaths
Male long-distance runners from Northern Ireland
English male marathon runners
Male athletes from Northern Ireland
Olympic athletes of Great Britain
Olympic silver medallists for Great Britain
Sportspeople from County Down
Athletes (track and field) at the 1924 Summer Olympics
Athletes (track and field) at the 1928 Summer Olympics
Athletes (track and field) at the 1932 Summer Olympics
Commonwealth Games silver medallists for England
Commonwealth Games medallists in athletics
Athletes (track and field) at the 1930 British Empire Games
Medalists at the 1932 Summer Olympics
Olympic silver medalists in athletics (track and field)
Male marathon runners from Northern Ireland
Medallists at the 1930 British Empire Games